Lewiston is a city in Winona County, Minnesota, United States. The population was 1,620 at the 2010 census.

History
A post office called Lewiston has been in operation since 1872. The city was named for Jonathan Smith Lewis, a pioneer settler. Lewiston was incorporated in 1873. Lewiston - the first stop on the Winona-Rochester stagecoach line - was an important source of support for those travelers.

Geography

Demographics

2010 census
As of the census of 2010, there were 1,622 people, 600 households, and 428 families living in the city. The racial makeup of the city was 97.0% White, 1.2% African American, 0.1% Native American, 0.7% Asian, 0.4% from other races, and 0.6% from two or more races. Hispanic or Latino of any race were 1.3% of the population.

There were 600 households, of which 38.5% had children under the age of 18 living with them, 59.0% were married couples living together, 8.3% had a female householder with no husband present, 4.0% had a male householder with no wife present, and 28.7% were non-families. 25.0% of all households were made up of individuals, and 11% had someone living alone who was 65 years of age or older. The average household size was 2.62 and the average family size was 3.15.

The median age in the city was 36.2 years. 29.9% of residents were under the age of 18; 5.8% were between the ages of 18 and 24; 26.7% were from 25 to 44; 24.5% were from 45 to 64; and 13.2% were 65 years of age or older. The gender makeup of the city was 50.9% male and 49.1% female.

2000 census
As of the census of 2000, there were 1,484 people, 538 households, and 392 families living in the city. The racial makeup of the city was 98.72% White, 0.61% African American, 0.34% Native American, 0.07% Asian, 0.07% from other races, and 0.20% from two or more races. Hispanic or Latino of any race were 0.88% of the population.

There were 538 households, out of which 40.3% had children under the age of 18 living with them, 60.6% were married couples living together, 7.8% had a female householder with no husband present, and 27.1% were non-families. 24.2% of all households were made up of individuals, and 12.6% had someone living alone who was 65 years of age or older.  The average household size was 2.67 and the average family size was 3.19.

In the city, the population was spread out, with 29.7% under the age of 18, 8.0% from 18 to 24, 29.0% from 25 to 44, 18.5% from 45 to 64, and 14.9% who were 65 years of age or older.  The median age was 35 years. For every 100 females, there were 96.6 males.  For every 100 females age 18 and over, there were 94.2 males.

The median income for a household in the city was $43,220, and the median income for a family was $48,631. Males had a median income of $32,037 versus $22,083 for females. The per capita income for the city was $17,666.  About 4.7% of families and 5.7% of the population were below the poverty line, including 7.0% of those under age 18 and 7.5% of those age 65 or over.

Religion
St. John's Lutheran Church is a member of the Wisconsin Evangelical Lutheran Synod (WELS) in Lewiston.

Immanuel Lutheran Church is a member of the Lutheran Church Missouri Synod (LCMS) in Lewiston.

Education
St. John's Lutheran School is a preschool and K-8 school operated by the Wisconsin Evangelical Lutheran Synod (WELS) in Lewiston.

Immanuel Lutheran School (Silo) is a K-8 school operated by the Lutheran Church Missouri Synod (LCMS) in Lewiston.

Lewiston-Althra public school is mainly located in Lewiston as well.

References

External links
 City of Lewiston

Cities in Minnesota
Cities in Winona County, Minnesota